The National League West is one of Major League Baseball's six divisions. This division was formally formed for the 1969 season when the National League (NL) expanded to 12 teams by adding the San Diego Padres and the Montreal Expos. For purpose of keeping a regular-season of 162 games, half of the teams were put into the new East Division and half into the new West Division. Within each division, the teams played 18 games each against their five division mates (90 games), and also 12 games against the teams in the opposite division (72 games), totaling 162 games. Prior to 1969, the National League had informal, internal divisions strictly for scheduling purposes.

Geography
Despite the geography, the owners of the Chicago Cubs insisted that their team be placed into the East Division along with the teams in New York City, Philadelphia, and Pittsburgh. Also, the owners of the St. Louis Cardinals wanted that team to be in the same division with their natural rivals of the Cubs. The league could have insisted on a purely geographical alignment like the American League did. But the owners were also concerned about what they thought would be a large imbalance in the strength of the divisions. In the previous two seasons prior to realignment, the Cardinals, Giants, and Cubs finished 1-2-3 in the National League standings. The owners were concerned about putting those teams in the same division, thereby creating one very strong division (West) and one weak one (East). Given all of this, the owners of the Atlanta Braves and the Cincinnati Reds consented to being placed into the West Division, even though Atlanta and Cincinnati are both in the Eastern Time Zone. Hence, the West Division had teams spread all the way from the East to the Pacific Coast, and scattered over three time zones (no MLB teams played in the Mountain Time Zone until 1993, when the Colorado Rockies were enfranchised). The East Division was spread over the Eastern Time Zone and the Central Time Zone - despite the fact that the National League had six teams in the Eastern Time Zone and six teams spread between the Central Time Zone and the Pacific Time Zone.

All of this increased the traveling distances and times for all of the teams, and it also made radio broadcasting and TV broadcasts of the games more difficult to schedule. The Braves and the Reds had to travel all the way to California three times during each baseball season, and the three teams in California had to travel to Atlanta, Cincinnati, and Houston three times also. Sometimes, the trouble could be alleviated for them by playing some games in Chicago, St. Louis, or Pittsburgh on the same long road trips. The 1994 addition of the Central Division would remedy these problems, when the Reds and Braves moved to the NL Central and NL East respectively.

First season
The very first baseball season of division play, 1969, resulted in what might be considered by many to be two of the best pennant races in Major League baseball history. In the National League West, five of the teams battled for the divisional championship - with only the expansion team, the San Diego Padres, failing to be a contender. The remaining five teams were separated by as few as one-and-one-half games in the standings on August 18, despite the Houston Astros having lost 20 of its first 24 games.

Beginning in mid-August the Houston Astros and the Los Angeles Dodgers started collapsing, leaving the Braves, the Reds, and the San Francisco Giants in contention. Following a very-long hot streak in July, August, and September, the Braves clinched the divisional championship by winning their next-to-last game. The Giants finished in a close second place. One of the main factors in the big surge by the Braves was that the slugging outfielder Rico Carty returned to the team after missing the first half of the season while he was recovering from tuberculosis. Carty immediately resumed his starring role, adding to the powerful offensive line-up of the Braves that also featured the sluggers Hank Aaron and Orlando Cepeda and the good singles hitter Félix Millán who was on base to score a lot of runs. Aaron finished in third place for the N.L. Most Valuable Player Award, and the starting pitcher Phil Niekro finished in second place for the N.L. Cy Young Award.
 
Perhaps this latter pennant race was overshadowed by that of the New York Mets and the Chicago Cubs, with the Mets coming back from trailing by nine-and-one-half games near midseason to overtake the Chicago Cubs for the East championship. The sometimes called "Miracle Mets" won the first National League Championship Series over the Braves three games to none, and then the Mets defeated the Baltimore Orioles four games to one in the World Series in October 1969.

Divisional membership

Current members
Arizona Diamondbacks - Joined in 1998 as an expansion team
Colorado Rockies - Joined in 1993 as an expansion team
Los Angeles Dodgers - Founding member
San Diego Padres - Founding member
San Francisco Giants - Founding member

Former members
Atlanta Braves - Founding member - moved to the NL East in 1994.
Cincinnati Reds - Founding member - moved to the NL Central in 1994.
Houston Astros - Founding member - moved to the NL Central in 1994, then to the AL West in 2013.

Division lineups

 Place cursor over year for division champ or World Series team.
 

 The creation of the division with the expansion of the league - with the Padres added.
 With the Rockies added as an expansion team.
 With the Braves moved to Eastern Division and the Reds and the Astros moved to the Central Division
 With the  Diamondbacks added as an expansion team.

Division champions
Before the forming of a third division in both leagues in 1994, the winners of each division competed in a best-of-five series, with the series being lengthened by two possible games in 1985 to a best-of-seven series, dubbed the "League Championship Series" to determine the winner of the league pennant. This format was to be changed in 1994, though it was not carried out until 1995 due to the 1994–95 Major League Baseball strike that started on August 12, 1994. There was the addition of two further teams in the playoffs in each league. This has led to the creation of a "Division Series" round of the playoffs, in which two best-of-five series are conducted to determine the participants of the League Championship Series. As before, the winners of each league's pennant compete in the best-of-seven World Series to determine the champion of Major League Baseball.

Team names link to the season in which each team played

* – Defeated the Los Angeles Dodgers in a one game playoff for the division title, 7–1.

** – Defeated the Colorado Rockies in a one game playoff for the division title, 5–2.

† – Due to the 1981 Major League Baseball strike, the season was split. Los Angeles won the first half and defeated second-half champion Houston (61–49) in the postseason. The Cincinnati Reds had the best record in the division (66–42) overall but due to the split season did not qualify for the playoffs.

§ – Due to the players' strike starting August 12, no official winner was awarded. Los Angeles was leading at the strike.

†† – The San Diego Padres and Los Angeles Dodgers finished the 2006 season tied for first place with identical records. San Diego won the season series 13–5 against Los Angeles and was awarded the NL West title; Los Angeles was awarded the wild-card berth. Had a team from another division won the wild card, a one-game playoff would have decided the division champion.

††† – Due to the COVID-19 pandemic, MLB teams played 60 games, with teams play within their division and their respective counterpart (NL West vs. AL West, NL Central vs. AL Central, NL East vs. AL East). By virtue of the eight-team postseason format used for that season, division runner-up San Diego (37–23, .617) also qualified for the playoffs.

Other postseason teams
''See List of National League Wild Card winners (since 1994)
The wild card is given to the team in each league with the best record that did not win its division and was first introduced in 1994. The system, however, was not implemented until the following season, as a player strike prematurely ended the 1994 season. Since its implementation, three NL West teams have won the wild card, on six occasions.

* – The Colorado Rockies played the San Diego Padres in a wild card tie-breaker game after both teams finished the season with the same record, 89–73. The Rockies defeated the Padres, 9–8, in 13 innings.  A wild card tie-breaker game is still considered part of the regular season, and thus, the Rockies' win made it their 90th victory of the season.

** –  From 2012 to 2019, and in 2021, the Wild Card was expanded to two teams. Those teams faced each other in the Wild Card Game to determine the final participant in the National League Division Series. In 2020 only, eight teams, including the three division winners, played in a best-of-three Wild Card Series, with the winners advancing to the Division Series. Starting in 2022, the Wild Card field was increased to three teams, and along with the lowest-ranked division winner, qualified for the Wild Card Series to determine the remaining two slots in the Division Series.

Season results

Notes and Tiebreakers
 Houston and Los Angeles were tied for the division championship and played in a tie-breaker game. The Astros won 7–1 to claim the division crown.
 San Francisco and Chicago of the National League Central were tied for the wild-card berth and played in a tie-breaker game. The Giants lost 5–3 and were eliminated from postseason contention.
 San Diego and Los Angeles were tied for the division championship and wild-card berth, but the Padres claimed the division crown by winning the season series 13–5, relegating the Dodgers to the wild-card spot.
 Colorado and San Diego were tied for the wild-card berth and played in a tie-breaker game. The Rockies won 9–8 in 13 innings to claim the wild-card spot. 
 San Francisco and Pittsburgh of the National League Central were tied for both wild-card berths, but the Giants were relegated to the second wild-card spot by losing the season series 4–2.
 San Francisco and New York of the National League East were tied for both wild-card berths, but the Giants were relegated to the second wild-card spot by losing the season series 4–3.
 Los Angeles and Colorado were tied for the division championship and second wild-card berth and played in a tie-breaker game. The Dodgers won 5–2 to claim the division crown, while the Rockies were relegated to the second wild-card spot.
 San Francisco and Milwaukee of the National League Central were tied for the second wild-card berth, but the Giants were eliminated from postseason contention due to an inferior intra-division record (Milwaukee had a 19–21 record while San Francisco had an 18–22 record).

Division titles won by team

† indicates no longer in division since 1993

*indicates no longer in division since 1993, and no longer part of NL since 2013

See also
National League East
National League Central
American League East
American League Central
American League West

References

MLB Final Standings By Year

Major League Baseball divisions
Sports in the Western United States
1969 establishments in the United States